John Donoghue may refer to:
John Donoghue (neuroscientist), professor of neuroscience at Brown University; co-founder of Cyberkinetics
John Donoghue (writer) (born 1964), British humorist
John Donoghue (footballer) (1903–?), Scottish football player
John Francis Donoghue (1928–2011), American Roman Catholic bishop
John P. Donoghue (born 1957), American politician
John Talbott Donoghue (1853–1903), American artist

See also
John Donahue (disambiguation)
Jack Donohue (disambiguation)